Tjaša Kokalj is a Slovene actress, model and beauty pageant titleholder who was crowned Miss Universe Slovenia 2007 and was represented Slovenia at the Miss Universe 2007.

Early life
Kokalj is model and actress in Slovenia.

Pageantry

Miss Universe Slovenia 2007
Kokalj was crowned Miss Universe Slovenia 2007.

Miss Universe 2007
Kokalj was represented Slovenia at Miss Universe 2007 and placed Top 15.

External links
Official website
Official Facebook

Living people
Miss Universe 2007 contestants
People from Ljubljana
Slovenian female models
Slovenian beauty pageant winners
Year of birth missing (living people)